Missy Gold (born Melissa Fisher; July 14, 1970) is an American psychologist and former child actress. She is known as portraying the governor's daughter, Katie Gatling, on the sitcom Benson (1979–86).

Career
Gold appeared on Eight Is Enough, Fantasy Island, The Hardy Boys/Nancy Drew Mysteries,Trapper John, M.D. before playing Katie Gatling on Benson.

Gold is now a licensed psychologist.

Personal life
Gold was born on July 14, 1970.

Her acting siblings include older sister Tracey (best known as Carol on Growing Pains), younger sister Brandy (best known as Alexis on St. Elsewhere) and Jessie, who has had a variety of guest spots.

Gold earned a B.A. at Georgetown University and then earned a Ph.D. from California School of Professional Psychology.

Filmography

References

External links
 
 
 

1970 births
Living people
20th-century American actresses
Actresses from Montana
American child actresses
American film actresses
21st-century American psychologists
American television actresses
American women psychologists
California School of Professional Psychology alumni
Georgetown University alumni
People from Great Falls, Montana